The women's 100 metres hurdles competition at the 1998 Asian Games in Bangkok, Thailand was held on 19 December at the Thammasat Stadium.

Schedule
All times are Indochina Time (UTC+07:00)

Results
 Wind: −0.6 m/s

References

External links
Results

Women's 00100 metres
1998